Shirey is a surname. Notable people with the surname include:

Bill Shirey (born 1932), American racing driver
Duke Shirey (1898–1962), American baseball player
Fred Shirey (1916-1961), American football player 
Hilbert Shirey, American poker player
John Shirey (1898–1966), American college football player and engineer
Sxip Shirey, American electric-acoustic composer, performer, and story-teller